Chief Stephen Osita Osadebe (March 17, 1936 – May 11, 2007), often referred to as just Osita Osadebe, was a Nigerian highlife musician from Atani. During his career spanning over four decades, he became one of the best known musicians of Igbo highlife. His best-known hit was the 1984 single "Osondi Owendi", which established him as a leader in the highlife genre and was one of Nigeria's most popular records ever.

Biography
Osadebe was born in March 17, 1936, in the Igbo town of Atani in Southeastern Nigeria. He came from a line of singers and dancers in Igboland. His genre, Highlife, encompassed Igbo and traditional musical elements. Along with this, calypso, Samba, bolero, rumba, Jazz and waltz were also present in Osadebe's musical style. It was in his high school years in Onitsha, a major commercial city near Atani, that Osadebe grew interested in music.

Osadebe started his career singing at nightclubs in Lagos in the southwestern region of Nigeria. He had been a part of The Empire Rhythm Orchestra, led by E. C. Arinze in which he had learned much of his music skills. A prolific composer, Osadebe released his first album in 1958, and went on to write over 500 songs; half of which were released commercially.  After stints with the Stephen Amache Band and the Central Dance Band in around 1964, Osadebe struck out as a bandleader with his group the Sound Makers.

As he became better established, Osadebe's style matured to include social commentary, similar to, but not as confrontational as Fela Kuti. Personal trials and tribulations were usually the main topics of his commentaries. He sang in English, pidgin English and Igbo. Osadebe often extended his tracks for his audience's enjoyment, allowing room for 'people on the dance floor' to indulge in the songs. He earned the nickname "the Doctor of Hypertension" in reference to "the healing powers of his music".

Following the Nigerian Civil War in the late 1960s, the massive exodus of the eastern peoples of Nigeria (especially the Igbo) out of western Nigeria had caused the death of the Highlife's prominence in the then capital, Lagos. During the war and after the war Osadebe maintained his scheduled live performances. Jùjú music and later Afrobeat took precedence in Lagos, and in the 1970s James Brown and various other music forms became popular in the city. In this same decade, Osadebe's career had reached its zenith. After turning 50 in 1986, Osadebe started to give priority to fatherhood and gave more of his time to his son Obiora and his other children from his wives. One of Osita Osadebe's last albums is Kedu America.

Osita Osadebe died in St. Mary's Hospital Waterbury, Connecticut on 11 May 2007 after suffering from severe respiratory difficulties.

Discography

Singles
"United Nigeria" / "Okpaku Elieli"   Stephen Osadebay and Nigerian Soundmakers, 1962-63 (HMV NH37)
"Sylvanu Olympio" / "Ifeayi Chukwu"  Stephen Osadebay and Nigerian Soundmakers, 1962-63 (HMV NH41) 
"Monkey De Work Baboon De Chop" / "Nwezigbo Omume"   Commander In Chief Stephen Osita Osadebe & His Nigeria Sound Makers, 1971 (6259085 PE)/"Egwu Amala"/"Ndubusi"

Albums

Highlife Parade  Commander-in-Chief Stephen Osita Osadebe & His Nigerian Sound Makers, 1970 (PR 6386 009)
Stephen Osita Osadebe & His Nigeria Sound Makers  1972 (PL 6361 024) 		
Commander In Chief Stephen Osadebe & His Nigeria Sound Makers  1972 (PL 6361 015)	
Osadebe '75  Commander-In-Chief Stephen Osita Osadebe & His Nigerian Sound Makers International, 1975 (POLP 001)
Osadebe In London  Chief Stephen Osita Osadebe & His Nigerian Sound Makers International, 1975 (POLP 003)
Osadebe '76   Chief Stephen Osita Osadebe & His Nigeria Sound Makers International, 1975 (POLP 004)
Osadebe '76 Vol. 2  Chief Stephen Osita Osadebe & His Nigerian Sound Makers International,  1976 (POLP 007)
Chief Osadebe '77 Vol.1   1977 (POLP 010)
Osadebe '78   1977 (POLP 017)
Osadebe '78 Vol.2   1978 (POLP 024)
Arum Achoro Nsogbu  Chief Stephen Osita Osadebe And His Nigerian SoundMakers International, 1979 (POLP 032)
Agbalu Aka Azo Ani  1980 (POLP 052)
Osadebe In 80's - Oyolima Vol. 1  1980 (POLP 048)
Onu Kwulunjo, Okwue Nma  1981 (POLP 056)
Onye Bili - Ibeya Ebili  1981 (POLP 058)
Nke Onye Diliya  1981 (POLP 060)
Ogbahu Akwulugo  1982 (POLP 077) 		
Onye Ije Anatago  1982 (POLP 074)
Ndi Dum Tufu Dum Cho '83  1982 (SPOSA 002)
Igakam Ogonogo  1982 (POLP 089)
Onye Achonam  1982 (POLP 075)
Ok'puzo Enweilo  1982 (POLP 092)
Onye Kwusia Olieonuya  Chief Stephen Osita Osadebe And His Nigerian Sound Makers International, 1982 (POLP 101)
Unubi Top Special   Chief Stephen Osita Osadebe & His Nigerian Sound Makers International, 1984 (SPOSA 006)
Makojo  Chief Stephen Osita Osadebe & His Nigerian Sound Makers International, 1985 (POLP 125)
Nwanneka Special  Chief Stephen Osita Osadebe & His Nigerian Sound Makers International, 1986 (SPOSA 008)
Peoples Club Of Nigeria Special  Chief Stephen Osita Osadebe & His Nigerian Sound Makers International, 1987 (SPOSA 010)
Ife Onye Metalu  Chief Stephen Osita Osadebe & His Nigerian Sound Makers International, 1987 (POLP 165)
Ana Masi Ife Uwa  Chief Stephen Osita Osadebe & His Nigerian Sound Makers International, 1988 (POLP 194)
Nigeria Go Better  Chief Stephen Osita Osadebe & His Nigerian Sound Makers International, 1988 (POLP 184)
Eji - Keme Uwa   Chief Stephen Osita Osadebe & His Nigerian Sound Makers International, 1992 (JNLP 009)
Late Sam Okwaraji[Polp 245 -Chief Stephen  Osita Osadebe and his Nigerian Soundmakers International, 1990
 Ezi Oyi Amaka[Polp 232]-Chief Stephen Osita Osadebe and his Nigerian Soundmakers International, 1990
 Ndi Ochongonoko[Polp 144]-Chief Stephen Osita Osadebe and his Nigerian Soundmakers International, 1986
 Onyiewe Ewerato {Polp 008]-Chief Stephen Osita Osadebe and his Nigerian Soundmakers International, 1983
 Ofe Di Ufo [Agb 001]-Chief Osita Osadebe and his Nigerian Soundmakers International, 1981
Akwa-Etiti social club[SPOSA 005]-Chief Stephen Osita Osadebe and his Nigerian Soundmakers International, 1985
 Osondi Owendi  [Polp 120]-Chief Stephen Osita Osadebe and his Nigerian Soundmakers International, 1984
 Onye Atumuna [Polp 058]-Chief Stephen Osita Osadebe and his Nigerian Soundmakers International, 1991
 Onye Amamife[PMCD 024]-Chief Stephen Osita Osadebe and his Nigerian Soundmakers International, 1994
 Kedu America [XENO 4044]-Chief Stephen Osita Osadebe and his Nigerian Soundmakers International, 1996
 Ozonkemadu [SPOSA 012]-Chief Stephen Osita Osadebe And his Nigerian Soundmakers International, 1987
 Ife Chukwu Kanma [KMLP 001]-Chief Stephen Osita Osadebe his Nigerian Soundmakers International, 1991
 Ndia na Ndia [Polp 233]-Chief Stephen Osita Osadebe and his Soundmakers International, 2004

See also
Highlife music
Igbo music

References

Musicians from Anambra State
Igbo highlife musicians
Igbo-language singers
Igbo singer-songwriters
Nigerian male singer-songwriters
1936 births
2007 deaths
20th-century Nigerian male singers